Monte Alpi with its twin peaks Pizzo Falcone (1.900 m) and S. Croce (1.893 m) is a mountain of Basilicata, southern Italy.

Mountains of Basilicata
Mountains of the Apennines
One-thousanders of Italy